Hlib Hennadiyovych Bukhal (born 12 November 1995) is a Ukrainian professional footballer who plays as a centre-back for Polish club Chojniczanka Chojnice.

Career
Bukhal is a product of the different Kyivan Youth Sportive Schools.

He spent his early career playing in the Ukrainian Premier League Reserves for Arsenal Kyiv and Metalist Kharkiv, before appearing for Arsenal and Lviv in the Ukrainian Second League.

He was the member of the Ukraine student football team at the 2017 Summer Universiade in Taipei. In January 2022, he moved to Kryvbas Kryvyi Rih in Ukrainian First League.

In July 2022, Bukhal joined Bulgarian team Hebar Pazardzhik.

On 16 January 2023, Bukhal joined Polish I liga side Chojniczanka Chojnice on a half-a-year contract, with an option for another year.

References

External links

1995 births
Living people
Footballers from Kyiv
Ukrainian footballers
Ukraine student international footballers
Association football defenders
FC Arsenal Kyiv players
FC Metalist Kharkiv players
SC Chaika Petropavlivska Borshchahivka players
FC Lviv players
FC Oleksandriya players
FC Kryvbas Kryvyi Rih players
FC Hebar Pazardzhik players
Chojniczanka Chojnice players
Ukrainian Premier League players
Ukrainian Second League players
Ukrainian Amateur Football Championship players
Moravian-Silesian Football League players
First Professional Football League (Bulgaria) players

Ukrainian expatriate footballers
Expatriate footballers in the Czech Republic
Ukrainian expatriate sportspeople in the Czech Republic
Expatriate footballers in Bulgaria
Ukrainian expatriate sportspeople in Bulgaria
Expatriate footballers in Poland
Ukrainian expatriate sportspeople in Poland